The book Environmental Principles and Policies: An Interdisciplinary Introduction, written by Professor Sharon Beder, examines six well-known environmental and social principles that have been used at the international and national level. It uses them to evaluate the new wave of market-based policy instruments that have been introduced in many countries.

Six principles
The six principles discussed in the book are:

 the sustainability principle
 the polluter pays principle
 the precautionary principle
 the equity principle
 the human rights principles
 the participation principle

Interdisciplinary approach

This book on environmental policy-making takes a critical and interdisciplinary approach. Rather than merely setting out policy options in a descriptive way, it evaluates policies from different perspectives. This enables readers to gain a thorough understanding of important principles and current policies, and also to be able to apply the various principles and critically evaluate them.

The author

Professor Beder was included in a list of "Australia's most influential engineers", published by Engineers Australia in 2004.  She was also included in Bulletin Magazine's "Smart 100" in 2003.

See also

Sustainable development
Environmental policy
List of Australian environmental books

References

External links
Review: Principled environmental policy
Sample chapter

2006 in the environment
Textbooks
Environmental non-fiction books
Sustainability books
Books by Sharon Beder